A Day at the Beach is a 1970 British film based on the 1962 book Een dagje naar het strand by Dutch author Heere Heeresma.  The screenplay was written by Roman Polanski, who was originally intended to be the director, although most of the direction was finally done by first-timer Simon Hesera.

Plot
Set in a rundown Danish seaside resort, it depicts a day in the life of Bernie, a self-destructive alcoholic, as he takes Winnie, a young girl with a leg brace, to the resort despite constant rain.  Though Winnie calls Bernie "uncle", he is likely her biological father.  Over the course of the day, they encounter various people whom Bernie alternately berates and scams for alcohol, while Winnie is often left alone to fend for herself.

Cast
 Mark Burns as Bernie
 Beatie Edney as Winnie
 Fiona Lewis as Melissa
 Maurice Roëves as Nicholas
 Jack MacGowran as Ticket Seller
 Eva Dahlbeck as Café Proprietress
 Thomas Heathcote as Dice Player (credited as Tom Heathcote)
 Joanna Dunham as Tonie
 Graham Stark as Pipi
 Peter Sellers as Stallholder (credited as "A. Queen")

Release
The film was never released in theatres at the time of its completion, but has seen limited runs at film festivals since then. A small clip of the film appears in the documentary The Unknown Peter Sellers: Sellers himself has a cameo role as a small shop owner with his partner (played by Graham Stark), and both are homosexual. Sellers used the pseudonym "A. Queen" in the credits.

Restoration
The film spent two decades in a vault at Paramount in London and was restored in 1993 by its director and shown at the American Film Market. It had been lost due to a paperwork error.

Home media
The film is available on DVD in the U.S from Code Red DVD. It's available for streaming on Fandor.

References

External links
 
https://www.dvdtalk.com/reviews/36968/day-at-the-beach-1970-a/

1970 films
1970 comedy-drama films
British comedy-drama films
1970s English-language films
Films about alcoholism
Films based on Dutch novels
Films set in Denmark
Films with screenplays by Roman Polanski
1970 directorial debut films
1970 comedy films
1970 drama films
1970s British films